Violence is the use of physical force to cause injury, damage, or death.

Violence or The Violence may also refer to:

Music

Performers
Vio-lence, an American thrash metal band
Violence (musician), American electronic musician

Albums
Violence (Editors album) or the title song, 2018
Violence (Nothingface album), 2000
The Violence (album), by Darren Hayman, or the title song, 2012
Violence, by Tear Out the Heart, 2013

Songs
"Violence" (song), by Grimes and i_o, 2019
"The Violence", by Rise Against, 2017
"Violence", by Against Me! from Searching for a Former Clarity, 2005
"Violence", by Blink-182 from Blink-182, 2003
"Violence", by Mott the Hoople from Mott, 1973
"Violence", by Pet Shop Boys from Please, 1986
"Violence (Enough Is Enough)", by A Day to Remember from Common Courtesy, 2013

Other uses
 Violence (1947 film), an American film noir
 Violence (1955 film), a Swedish drama film
 Violence (role-playing game), a role-playing game by Greg Costikyan
 Violence, a 1992 novel by Richard Bausch
 Violence: Six Sideways Reflections, a 2008 book by Slavoj Žižek
 Violence (horse), an American thoroughbred racehorse

See also
 La Violencia, a 1948–1958 civil war in Colombia